This is a list of members of the Australian Senate from 1985 to 1987. The number of senators was increased from ten to twelve senators for each of the six states of Australia. The representation of the Northern Territory and the Australian Capital Territory remained at two senators each. This would give a total of 76 senators in the Senate.

30 state senators were elected at the 1983 double dissolution election and were allocated 6-year terms starting on 1 July 1982 and due to finish on 30 June 1988. The other 30 state senators elected were allocated 3-year terms starting on 1 July 1982 and due to finish on 30 June 1985, and were up for reelection in the 1984 election.

With 30 senators having terms due to finish in 1988, the other 42 state and 4 territory senators were elected at the 1984 election, rather than the normal case of only half of the state senators being elected. Therefore, each state would elect 7 senators instead of previous 5 in this election. With the increase of 12 state senators, some changes were made to the terms of senators elected in this election as per Representation Act 1983:
The first two non-sitting state senators to be elected (total 12) were chosen for a term starting immediately (1 December 1984) instead of the usual 1 July 1985. This would immediately increase the number of senators to 76 following the election. Terms were due to end on 30 June 1991 unless the senator(s) was elected last (7th) in the state (see next point).
The last (7th) state senators to be elected (total 6) were chosen for a term ending 30 June 1988. This would ensure that exactly half of the state senators (36 in total) would have their terms ending on 30 June 1988.
The changes affected 17 elected state senators, with David Vigor satisfying both criteria. All other state senators were elected as normal and had 6-year terms due to finish on 30 June 1991. The four territory senators elected had terms due to finish at the next dissolution of the House of Representatives as normal. However, the Senate was dissolved on 5 June 1987 for another double dissolution election on 11 July 1987.

Notes

References

Members of Australian parliaments by term
20th-century Australian politicians
Australian Senate lists